Will Henry Moore III is a former professional American football and Canadian football wide receiver. He played three seasons in the Canadian Football for the Calgary Stampeders and four seasons in the National Football League for the New England Patriots and the Jacksonville Jaguars. He currently lives in Jacksonville, Florida. His best season came in 1995 when he caught 43 balls for 502 yards and one touchdown.

References

1970 births
Living people
Players of American football from Dallas
American football wide receivers
Canadian football wide receivers
Texas Southern Tigers football players
Calgary Stampeders players
New England Patriots players
Jacksonville Jaguars players